Jóvito Villalba Gutiérrez (March 23, 1908 – July 8, 1989), was a Venezuelan lawyer and politician, member of the Generation of 1928, founder of the party URD (Democratic Republican Union) and signer of the Puntofijo Pact.

See also 
 
List of Venezuelans

References 
 Biography at Venezuelatuya.com
 Biography of the José Guillermo Carrillo Foundation

1908 births
1989 deaths
People from Nueva Esparta
Venezuelan people of Spanish descent
Democratic Republican Union politicians
Members of the Senate of Venezuela
Members of the Venezuelan Chamber of Deputies
Venezuelan democracy activists
Central University of Venezuela alumni
Academic staff of the Central University of Venezuela
20th-century Venezuelan lawyers
Prisoners and detainees of Venezuela
Generation of 1928